The I Wish Tour is the second headlining tour by British recording artist Cher Lloyd. The tour is in support of her second studio album, Sorry I'm Late, released in May 2014.

The tour kicked off on 23 August 2013 in Recife, Brazil. After a few Brazil dates, the tour continued into North America until 3 November 2013 at Orlando, Florida. Further concerts were held from February to July 2014 in the United States and the United Kingdom. It is also her first tour to perform mainly in North America.

Fifth Harmony, Zara Larsson and Jackson Guthy were the opening acts for the tour.

Background
Cher Lloyd spoke about the tour in an interview with Artistdirect.
She said, "I really wanted to make it intimate. I want fans to feel like they're almost on stage with me. Connecting with everyone in a room can be a difficult task. I really wanted to open the door a little bit and perform some brand new songs. I'm a little nervous because they obviously haven't been released yet. No one has the actual recordings. Tonight, for the first time, I'm going to be performing them live. I understand they're going to get put on the internet. I'm nervous about it [Laughs]. They're getting a preview of the album, and it's live. I'd better do it well!"

Opening acts
Fifth Harmony
Zara Larsson
Jackson Guthy

Setlist
"Swagger Jagger"
"Playa Boi"
"Superhero"
"Talkin That"
"Bind Your Love"
"In for the Kill" (La Roux cover)
"Breathing" (Jason Derulo cover)
"OMG" (Usher cover)
"Goodnight"
"Dirty Love"
"Sweet Despair"
"Oath"
"I Wish"
"With Ur Love"
"Want U Back"

Brazil Setlist:
"Swagger Jagger"
"Playa Boi"
"Superhero"
"Beautiful People"
"Dub On The Track"
"Over the Moon"
"End Up Here"
"Talkin' That"
"Oath"
"With Ur Love"
"Want U Back"

Tour dates

Box office score data

References 

2013 concert tours
Cher Lloyd concert tours